Jourdan Sebastian a.k.a. The Dreamer, is an independent Filipino Spoken Word artist, director, executive producer, writer, actor, filmmaker, beat poet, acting coach, creative director, music video director and neo-ilustrado movement proponent. He is also the author of the Dreamer's  Manifesto.

Albums
 Bigkas Pilipinas (2007)

Films
  Scaregivers 2008
  Isnats 2005
  Ploning  2005 (as producer & cameo appearance)

References

External links
 Official Multiply Site

Spoken word poets
Living people
Year of birth missing (living people)
Place of birth missing (living people)
Filipino musicians